Harrisburg High School is a public secondary school in Harrisburg, Missouri. It is operated by the Harrisburg R-VIII School District and serves northwest Boone County, Missouri. It borders the Sturgeon and Columbia Public School Districts.

References

External links
Official site

Harrisburg, Missouri
Public high schools in Missouri
High schools in Boone County, Missouri